Cambridge is a constituency represented in the House of Commons of the UK Parliament since 2015 by Daniel Zeichner of the Labour Party.

It was held by the Conservatives from 1967 to 1992, since when it has been represented alternately by both Labour and the Liberal Democrats.

In the 2016 referendum to leave the European Union, the constituency voted 73.8% to remain.

Constituency profile
One of the oldest continuously constituted constituencies, it was created in 1295 and is centred on the university city of Cambridge.

The current constituency covers the majority of the city of Cambridge, including the areas of Arbury (which contains some social housing), Chesterton, Newnham, Cherry Hinton and the village of Trumpington; but the city's Queen Edith's ward (which includes Addenbrooke's Hospital and Homerton College) is in the neighbouring South Cambridgeshire constituency. Trumpington was added in 2010 from the South Cambridgeshire constituency.

Residents are healthier and wealthier than the UK average.

History

Overview of results before 1992 
Cambridge returned two Members to Parliament from 1295 until 1885, using the bloc vote system. These were generally townsmen who were involved in local government, with at least sixty mayors of Cambridge having served as MP by 1621. Under the Redistribution of Seats Act 1885 representation was reduced to one member with effect from the 1885 general election.

From 1910 to 1992, Cambridge was won by the Conservatives, save for 1945 to 1950 and 1966 to 1968, when it was Labour-held.

Related extra representation 1603–1950
Historically, the city of Cambridge retained some electors, and was often the source of MPs to a second constituency, for Cambridge University, covering all successful alumni in its electorate. The university seat was created in 1603 as part of the scheme of University constituencies. Its MPs included Isaac Newton, William Pitt the Younger, Lord Palmerston, George Stokes, Richard Jebb, and Archibald Hill before abolition in 1950.

Overview of results since 1992 
In 1992, Cambridge was won by Labour's Anne Campbell, who held onto the seat for 13 years (three Parliamentary terms). In 2005, it was taken by David Howarth of the Liberal Democrats, the first time the party (including its two forerunner parties) had taken the seat since the 1906 Liberal-progressive landslide; his successor, Julian Huppert, held the seat with an increased majority in the 2010 general election. In 2015, Huppert was unseated by the Labour candidate, Daniel Zeichner, who took the seat with a thin majority of 599 votes. The 2015 result gave the seat the 7th-smallest majority of Labour's 232 seats by percentage of majority.

Most recent results of other parties
In 2015, three other parties candidates kept their deposits, by winning more than 5% of the vote. In order of public preference, these candidates stood for the Conservatives, Green Party and UKIP, respectively.

Turnout since 1918
Turnout at general elections has ranged between 86.48% in 1950 to 60.6% in 2001.

Boundaries 

1868–1918: The Borough of Cambridge, plus the village of Chesterton.

1918–1950: The Borough of Cambridge.

Under the Representation of the People Act 1918, the boundaries were expanded to align with those of the Municipal Borough, incorporating further parts of the former Urban District of Chesterton not already included in the Parliamentary Borough to the north, and the parish of Cambridge Without to the south.

1950–1983: As 1918 but with redrawn boundaries.

The boundaries were further expanded for the 1950 general election, under the Representation of the People Act 1948.

1983–2010: The City of Cambridge wards of Abbey, Arbury, Castle, Cherry Hinton, Coleridge, East Chesterton, King's Hedges, Market, Newnham, Petersfield, Romsey, and West Chesterton.

2010–present: The City of Cambridge wards of Abbey, Arbury, Castle, Cherry Hinton, Coleridge, East Chesterton, King's Hedges, Market, Newnham, Petersfield, Romsey, Trumpington, and West Chesterton.

Members of Parliament 
 Constituency created (1295)

MPs 1295–1660

MPs 1660–1885

MPs since 1885

Elections

Elections in the 2010s

Elections in the 2000s

Elections in the 1990s

Elections in the 1980s

Elections in the 1970s

Elections in the 1960s

Elections in the 1950s

Elections in the 1940s

Elections in the 1930s

Elections in the 1920s

Elections in the 1910s

Elections in the 1900s

Elections in the 1890s

Elections in the 1880s

Elections in the 1870s

Elections in the 1860s

 

 Election of William Forsyth declared void on petition, due to his holding an office of profit under the Crown. 

 

 Resignation of Andrew Steuart.

Elections in the 1850s

 

 

 Previous election declared void on petition, due to bribery and treating.

Elections in the 1840s

 By-election triggered by the appointment of Fitzroy Kelly as Solicitor-General of England and Wales 

 By-election triggered by the resignation of Sir Alexander Cray Grant, Bt. by accepting the office of Steward of the Manor of Poynings 

 Previous by-election declared void on petition due to bribery and treating by Manners-Sutton's agents.

Elections in the 1830s

  By-election triggered by the elevation to the peerage of Thomas Spring Rice as Lord Monteagle of Brandon.  

 By-election triggered by the appointment of Thomas Spring Rice as Chancellor of the Exchequer. 

 By-election triggered by the appointment of Thomas Spring Rice as Secretary of State for War and the Colonies.

Elections in the 1820s

 By-election triggered by the death of Charles Madryl Cheere. 

 By-election triggered by the appointment of the Marquess of Graham as Commander of the Board of Control. 

 By-election triggered by the appointment of Frederick William Trench as Storekeeper of Ordnance.

Elections in the 1810s

 By-election triggered by the resignation of the Hon. Edward Finch.

Elections in the 1800s

 By-election triggered by the appointment of Robert Manners as First Equerry and Clerk Marshal of the Mews.

Elections in the 1790s

 By-election triggered by the simultaneous election of Francis Dickins for Northamptonshire, and his decision to sit for that constituency instead of Cambridge.

Elections in the 1780s

 By-election triggered by the appointment of John Mortlock to office. 

 By-election triggered by the appointment of James Whorwood Adeane to office.

Elections in the 1770s

 By-election triggered by the elevation to the peerage of Charles Sloane Cadogan.

Elections in the 1760s

 By-election triggered by the appointment of Charles Sloane Cadogan to office. 

 By-election triggered by the appointment of Charles Sloane Cadogan to office.

Elections in the 1750s

 By-election triggered by the succession to the peerage of Thomas Bromley. 

 By-election triggered by the appointment of Thomas Hay, Viscount Dupplin, to office. 

 By-election triggered by the appointment of Thomas Hay, Viscount Dupplin, to office. 

 By-election triggered by the succession to the peerage Thomas Hay, Viscount Dupplin.

Graphical representation

See also 
 List of parliamentary constituencies in Cambridgeshire

Notes

References

Sources

External links 
nomis Constituency Profile for Cambridge – presenting data from the ONS annual population survey and other official statistics.
 Cambridge Constituency Parliamentary Elections since 1832

Constituency
Constituency
Parliamentary constituencies in Cambridgeshire
Constituency
Constituencies of the Parliament of the United Kingdom established in 1295